There have been 8 coaches of the St. George Illawarra Dragons since the joint venture club's formation in 1999.

List of Coaches
As the end of the 2021 NRL season

See also

List of current NRL coaches
List of current NRL Women's coaches

References

External links

Coaches
 
Sydney-sport-related lists
National Rugby League lists
Lists of rugby league coaches